Christian People's Party is a name or former name of several European and Latin American Christian Democratic parties including:

Christian People's Party (Belgium)
Christian People's Party (Dominican Republic)
Christian People's Party (Estonia)
Christian People's Party (Faroe Islands)
Christian People's Party (Germany)
Christian Democratic Party (Norway)
Christian People's Party (Peru)

Ruthenian Peasants Party (Czechoslovakia)